Dalan Drama is a Nepali TV series which display the socio-cultural transformation of Nepal, during 1951 to 1995, from the view point of Dalit. It is directed by Nabin Subba.

References

Nepalese television series
Nepalese television sitcoms
20th century in Nepal